No Rest for the Wicked is a 2011 Spanish thriller film directed by Enrique Urbizu, written by Urbizu and Michel Gaztambide and starring José Coronado, Juanjo Artero and Helena Miquel.

The film won six Goya Awards, including Best Film, Best Director, Best Original Writing and Best Leading Actor.

Plot
Santos Trinidad, a corrupt policeman and disgraced former GEO (
Spanish police equivalent to SWAT) member, goes binge drinking late at night.  He is thrown out of a bar and aggressively demands a drink from a waitress in another bar despite the fact that they are closed.  The manager attempts to defuse the situation by offering Trinidad a free drink, but his physical proximity is deemed too invasive by Trinidad, whose training and instincts suddenly rouse him from his drunken stupor; he breaks the manager's nose, the bouncer draws a pistol, and Trinidad shoots each of them dead.  As Trinidad cleans up the evidence, an eyewitness escapes.  After Trinidad studies their wallets for clues on the identity of the eyewitness, he destroys all identifying papers.

Chacón and Leiva investigate the crime.  Without any way to identify the victims, their investigation proceeds slowly, though they initially suspect a gangland hit.  After using the police's resources to identify the witness' license plates, Trinidad searches his apartment and car.  Trinidad takes the man's GPS device, which he uses to identify common locations.  Though he attempts to disguise himself, he is caught on a surveillance camera.  Trinidad later tracks the man down and pursues him to the subway, where he attempts to kill him, only to be stabbed by an accomplice that the witness calls.

Trinidad and Chacón separately come to realize that the murder victims had ties to the Colombian drug cartels.  Each seek out Rachid, a police informer who was previously involved with the same groups.  Chacón, through her contacts with anti-terrorism intelligence, finds him first.  Rachid tells her that his former acquaintances move from drugs to Islamic militancy, though he lost track of where they were based.  Chacón questions Trinidad after seeing his egress from the apartment on the apartment complex's surveillance camera, but without any solid evidence she is forced to let him go free.

By threatening Rachid's ex-girlfriend, Trinidad tracks down Rachid, whom he also threatens.  Rachid takes Trinidad through Madrid, where they attempt to track down the Islamic terrorist cell to which the witness belongs.  Meanwhile, the cell purchases and sets a series of bombs in a Madrid shopping mall hidden as fire extinguishers.  Trinidad arrives at their headquarters while they place the bombs.  Trinidad kills all of the terrorists, including the witness, before they can remotely detonate the bombs.  However, he is again stabbed, this time fatally.  Chacón and Leiva arrive at the scene after his death.  The film ends with several scenes of crowds of people at the mall, none of whom know that the bombs are still active.

Cast
 José Coronado as Santos Trinidad
 Helena Miquel as Judge Chacón
 Juanjo Artero as Leiva
 Rodolfo Sancho as Rodolfo
 Pedro María Sánchez as Ontiveros
 Younes Bachir as Rachid
 Karim El-Kerem as Young Handsome Guy

Reception
Jonathan Holland of Variety called Coronado's performance "grippingly visceral" and described the film as "credible, fast-moving, hard-nosed fare".  Deborah Young of The Hollywood Reporter wrote that the film, while conventional, is "a tense, briskly paced genre thriller".  Fionnuala Halligan of Screen Daily called it "a deliciously complicated and gritty Spanish thriller".

In March 2012, American actor Sylvester Stallone expressed interest in making an American adaptation of the film.

Awards

See also 
 List of Spanish films of 2011

References

External links
 
 

2011 films
2011 crime thriller films
Spanish crime thriller films
2010s Spanish-language films
Spanish neo-noir films
Films shot in Spain
Films set in Madrid
Films produced by Álvaro Augustin
Films produced by Javier Ugarte
2010s Spanish films